Newton is a city in Catawba County, North Carolina, United States. As of the 2010 census, the city had a population of 12,968. It is the county seat of Catawba County. Newton is part of the Hickory–Lenoir–Morganton Metropolitan Statistical Area.

History

Newton was established in 1845 and incorporated in 1855.  It was named for Isaac Newton Wilson, a state legislator who had introduced the bill creating Catawba County.

Geography
Newton is located at the center of Catawba County, at 35°39'54" North, 81°13'28" West (35.665082, −81.224351). It is bordered to the north by Conover and to the northwest by Hickory. Claremont is to the northeast, and Maiden is to the south.

Demographics

2020 census

As of the 2020 United States census, there were 13,148 people, 5,076 households, and 3,332 families residing in the city.

2000 census
As of the census of 2000, there were 12,560 people, 5,007 households, and 3,314 families living in the city. The population density was 968.4 people per square mile (373.9/km2). There were 5,368 housing units at an average density of 413.9 per square mile (159.8/km2). The racial composition of the city was: 77.58% White, 12.33% Black or African American, 9.52% Hispanic or Latino American, 3.40% Asian American, 0.43% Native American, 0.03% Native Hawaiian or Other Pacific Islander, 4.63% some other race, and 1.60% two or more races.

There were 5,007 households, out of which 29.4% had children under the age of 18 living with them, 47.2% were married couples living together, 14.4% had a female householder with no husband present, and 33.8% were non-families. 28.8% of all households were made up of individuals, and 13.6% had someone living alone who was 65 years of age or older. The average household size was 2.46 and the average family size was 3.00.

In the city, the population was spread out, with 23.8% under the age of 18, 8.8% from 18 to 24, 29.3% from 25 to 44, 21.4% from 45 to 64, and 16.8% who were 65 years of age or older. The median age was 37 years. For every 100 females, there were 91.8 males. For every 100 females age 18 and over, there were 88.6 males.

The median income for a household in the city was $36,696, and the median income for a family was $44,330. Males had a median income of $27,237 versus $22,963 for females. The per capita income for the city was $18,427. 12.1% of the population and 8.4% of families were below the poverty line. Out of the total population, 19.1% of those under the age of 18 and 13.2% of those 65 and older were living below the poverty line.

Places of interest

Listings on the National Register of Historic Places for places in Newton, North Carolina:
Bost-Burris House
Catawba County Courthouse, a 1924 courthouse by architects Willard G. Rogers and J.J. Stout, which now houses the Catawba County Museum of History
Foil–Cline House, also called the John A. Foil House, an 1883 domestic dwelling
Grace Reformed Church, a historic church built in 1887 in the Gothic Revival style
Long, McCorkle and Murray Houses, 1890 houses in the Craftsman and Queen Anne architectural styles
Newton Downtown Historic District
North Main Avenue Historic District
Perkins House
Rudisill–Wilson House
Self–Trott–Bickett House
St. Paul's Church and Cemetery, a log weatherboarded church built in 1808 featuring a federal style interior

Notable people
 Tori Amos, singer-songwriter and pianist
 Cherie Berry, politician and the current North Carolina Commissioner of Labor
 Glenn Buff, American architect
 Rashad Coulter, MMA fighter
 Bobby Hicks, bluegrass fiddler and musician
 Robert W. Lee IV, pastor of Unifour Church
 Shane Lee, NASCAR driver
 Brock Long, emergency manager who served as the Administrator of the Federal Emergency Management Agency (FEMA)
 Buz Phillips, former MLB player for the Philadelphia Phillis
 Jerry Punch, auto racing and college football commentator for ESPN
 Dennis Setzer, former NASCAR driver
 Alonzo C. Shuford, U.S. Representative from North Carolina
 Wilson Warlick, former United States federal judge
 Eddie Yount, former MLB player for the Philadelphia Athletics and Pittsburgh Pirates

Media
The Observer News Enterprise, daily newspaper reporting local news and sports for Newton, Conover and the surrounding communities since 1879
Outlook, weekly entertainment and activity guide distributed in Newton, Conover and Hickory 
 The Claremont Courier, free monthly publication

References

External links

 City website

Cities in Catawba County, North Carolina
County seats in North Carolina